Bear Lake is an unincorporated settlement in northern British Columbia, approximately 70 km north of Prince George along Highway 97.

Geography and Politics

Bear Lake is a designated place (by Statistics Canada and BC Stats), located in the Regional District of Fraser-Fort George.

The community is in the provincial electoral district of Prince George-Mackenzie, and the MLA is Mike Morris. Federally, it falls in the Prince George-Peace River electoral district, the seat was filled by Bob Zimmer in the 2011 Federal Election.

Education
Bear Lake Elementary School, administered by School District 57 Prince George, was closed in approximately 2005. Students, both elementary and secondary, are bused to schools in Salmon Valley and Prince George, approximately 45 km and 60 km away respectively.

References

External links
 BC Stats Products & Services

Unincorporated settlements in British Columbia
Designated places in British Columbia